Patricia Parris (also professionally credited as Pat Parris, Patty Parris, Patti Parris and Patricia E. Parris) is an American actress who provided voice-overs for several animated television series for such studios as Hanna-Barbera, The Walt Disney Company and The Jim Henson Company. She has voice acted in television, film, radio, read-along story recordings, video games and theme park attractions.

Early life
Parris was born in Hamilton, Ohio, the daughter of Col. Howard Lindsey Parris, a United States Air Force veteran, and Bernice Claire Rogers. She graduated from the women's college of Brenau University in 1972 where she majored in drama, English and secondary education, directing and performing in plays such as My Fair Lady and The Children's Hour. She would also introduce her show on the school radio station with her ever-expanding uncanny knack for accents and impersonation.

Career
Once she graduated, Parris moved to Hollywood, California and studied voice acting under the guidance of Daws Butler (voice of Yogi Bear) as a student in his voice acting workshop. Her first television voice-over role was Shelly on Jabberjaw (1976) produced by Hanna-Barbera. Throughout the 1970s and 1980s, other voice-over credits included Yogi's Space Race, Buford and the Galloping Ghost, Shirt Tales, The Littles, The Smurfs, Sherlock Hound, Dumbo's Circus, Fraggle Rock: The Animated Series, DuckTales and The New Adventures of Winnie the Pooh, as well as numerous roles on the Disneyland Records read-along storybook recordings for Pinocchio, Bambi, Cinderella, Lady and the Tramp, Mary Poppins and Pete's Dragon. She has voiced the character of Princess Leia for the read-along storybook records of the original Star Wars trilogy.

Parris has also voiced Daisy Duck on two occasions: the 1983 Mickey Mouse theatrical featurette Mickey's Christmas Carol and at the beginning of a song called "Girl Talk" having a brief telephone conversation with Minnie Mouse (voiced by Russi Taylor) on the 1986 children's LP Totally Minnie. She is also known for having frequently voiced the character of Kanga on Winnie the Pooh TV series, read-along storybooks and video games.

She occasionally voiced the role of Mary Barclay on the Focus on the Family radio drama Adventures in Odyssey from 1989 to 1992 and again in 2002. Although she is primarily a behind-the-scenes actress, Parris has done a few on-camera appearances, including the made-for-television film Attack on Fear (1984), a 1985 episode of the prime time soap opera Knots Landing and several commercials. She has also provided vocals to live-action feature films such as Wolfen, Gor II, White Fang and Look Who's Talking Now.

Filmography

Film

Television

Audio recordings

Radio

Read-along storybooks / albums

Educational films

Video games

References

External links
 
 
 

Living people
American voice actresses
American radio actresses
American television actresses
American video game actresses
Actresses from Ohio
People from Hamilton, Ohio
Brenau University alumni
Disney people
Hanna-Barbera people
Audiobook narrators
20th-century American actresses
21st-century American actresses
Year of birth missing (living people)